Gérard Macé (born Paris, 4 December 1946) is a French poet, essayist, translator and photographer. He published his first book Le jardin des langues in 1974 and since then has published nearly 50 books. His work is noted for its mixing of diverse genres. He has won many prizes including the Grand prix de poésie from the Academie Francaise for the entirety of his work.

His poetry has been published in English translation by Bloodaxe Books.

References

20th-century French poets
21st-century French poets
21st-century French male writers
French essayists
French photographers
Prix Roger Caillois recipients
Prix France Culture winners
Prix Valery Larbaud winners
Writers from Paris
1946 births
Living people
20th-century French male writers
French male non-fiction writers